Becky Hobbs (born January 24, 1950) is an American country singer, songwriter and pianist. She has recorded seven studio albums, and has charted multiple singles on the Billboard Hot Country Songs charts, including the 1983 Top Ten hit "Let's Get Over Them Together", a duet with Moe Bandy.

Besides her work as a solo artist, Hobbs has written for several country and pop acts, such as Helen Reddy, George Jones, Loretta Lynn, and Shelly West. With Candy Parton she co-wrote Alabama's 1985 song, "I Want to Know You Before We Make Love", later covered by Conway Twitty in 1987.

Discography

Albums

AAll Keyed Up was re-released on RCA Records in 1989 with two songs added.

Singles

Singles with Moe Bandy

Notes:
A "Pardon Me" did not chart on Hot Country Songs, but peaked at No. 2 on Hot Country Radio Breakouts.

Music videos

References

External links
Becky Hobbs official website

1950 births
Living people
People from Bartlesville, Oklahoma
American country pianists
American country singer-songwriters
American women country singers
Country musicians from Oklahoma
Curb Records artists
MTM Records artists
RCA Records Nashville artists
Singer-songwriters from Oklahoma
20th-century American pianists
20th-century American women pianists
21st-century American pianists
21st-century American women pianists